The 88th Indianapolis 500 was held at the Indianapolis Motor Speedway in Speedway, Indiana on Sunday, May 30, 2004. It was part of the 2004 IndyCar Series season and the ninth Indy 500 sanctioned by the Indy Racing League. Buddy Rice won the pole position, the pit stop contest, led the most laps, and won the race for team owners Bobby Rahal and David Letterman.

The race began about two hours behind schedule due to a morning rain delay. After 27 laps had been completed, rain began to fall again and threatened to wash out the rest of the day. About two hours later, the rain had ceased, and the track was dried. The race resumed on lap 28, and cruised beyond the halfway point to make the race official. At the 150-lap mark, the race had been very competitive up to that point, but was destined to come down to the final round of pit stops to decide the winner. Moreover, dark skies were looming, and inclement weather was moving back into the area. The race appeared to be turning into a crap-shoot. Some leaders headed for the pits for their final pit stops. At the same time, a handful of teams gambled by staying out, in hopes that they could stretch their fuel and be leading the race when the approaching rain arrived.

Despite desperate attempts to prevail over the approaching rain storm, all of the leaders ultimately were forced to cycle through their final round of pit stops. Nobody was able to stretch their fuel long enough to beat the rain. Buddy Rice, who had led the most laps thus far, re-emerged as the leader. The race was ended after 450 miles (180 laps), just 50 miles (20 laps) short of the scheduled distance. A severe thunderstorm, which eventually produced an F2 tornado, formed in the area of the speedway, shutting the track down, and sending the spectators and competitors for cover. Buddy Rice was declared the winner, his first victory in championship-level competition.

Race schedule

Practice
Rules changes were implemented before the start of the season, which reduced engine displacement from 3.5 L down to 3.0 L. In addition, on-board capacity of fuel was reduced from 35 gallons down to 30. The changes were made in an effort to curtail speeds, which had crept up into the low 230 mph range in 2003. It was also in the wake of a fatal accident at the Speedway. On October 22, 2003, during an off-season tire test, Tony Renna was killed in a crash. On a cool 50 degree morning, Renna spun in turn three, became airborne, and crashed into the outside wall and catch fence. The car was heavily damaged, and Renna died of massive internal trauma.

For the first time, single-point refueling rigs were allowed. During pit stops, teams were now allowed to utilize a single combined fuel/vent hose assembly. This eliminated the need for a separate vent hose and dedicated vent hose operator, improving safety.

Rookie Orientation
Rookie orientation was held April 26, with seven drivers participating. Newcomers Ed Carpenter, Kosuke Matsuura, Mark Taylor, and Luis Díaz passed all four phases of the rookie tests. Jeff Simmons and Marty Roth passed three phases, and can pass the fourth phase during routine practice.

Larry Foyt participated, but due to previous high-speed oval experience, was exempted from needing to pass the four-phase test.

Carpenter led the speed chart at 215.584 mph. Though Díaz passed the rookie test, he did not return with Ganassi for practice come May.

Sunday May 9
Scott Dixon led the speed chart with a lap of 219.760 mph on opening day. No incidents were reported.

Monday May 10
Track remained closed most of the afternoon, due to thunder storms. The track re-opened just before 5 p.m. and Hélio Castroneves set the fastest lap of the month at 220.300 mph. Late in the day, Robby Gordon spun and hit the outside wall in turn 2 but was uninjured.

Tuesday May 11
Felipe Giaffone brushed the wall in the north chute, then slid along the wall to the entrance to the pits. He was uninjured. Adrián Fernández became the first driver of the month to break the 221 mph barrier but Kosuke Matsuura (221.857 mph) ended up with the fastest lap of the day.

Wednesday May 12
Tony Kanaan drove the fastest lap of the month, at 222.668 mph.

Thursday May 13
Rain kept the track closed until 3 p.m. The session was ended about 10 minutes early when Scott Sharp crashed in turn 1. Hélio Castroneves turned the fastest lap of the day (221.156 mph). Buddy Rice was among the top five for the first time all week.

"Fast" Friday May 14
The track opened at 11 a.m. but lasted only four minutes, as rain began falling and closed the track for the day. During the brief session, only four cars had entered the track with Sarah Fisher (212.616 mph) the only car to run a single lap at speed.

Time trials: weekend 1

Pole Day - Saturday May 15
Pole day dawned cool and damp. Overnight rain kept the track closed until shortly after 12 noon. During the first practice session, Tony Kanaan reached 223.224 mph, the fastest lap of the month.

Pole qualifying began at 2:15 p.m. Roger Yasukawa earned the distinction as the first driver in the field. Shortly after, Robby Gordon qualified his car and immediately boarded a plane to Richmond to participate in the NASCAR event that evening. At 3:06 p.m., Dan Wheldon placed himself on the provisional pole position after a qualifying run of 221.524 mph. Several wave offs and two wrecks (Bryan Herta and Felipe Giaffone) characterized the early attempts.

At 4:14 p.m., Buddy Rice took over the pole position with a run of 222.024 mph. Rice held off late runs by Dario Franchitti and Tony Kanaan to secure his first Indy 500 pole. At the end of the day, the field was filled to 22 cars.

Second Day - Sunday May 16
Four cars completed attempts to fill the field to 26 cars. After wrecking the day before, both Bryan Herta and Felipe Giaffone put their cars safely in the field. Herta was the fastest qualifier of the afternoon.

Practice: week 2

Wednesday May 19
Mark Taylor brushed the wall in turn 2, but suffered only minor damage. Scott Dixon led all drivers at 220.576 mph, while Marty Roth was the fastest of the non-qualified cars (212.292 mph).

Thursday May 20
A. J. Foyt IV spun in turn 3 and brushed the inside wall, suffering minor damage. Kosuke Matsuura was the fastest of the day (220.784 mph). Marty Roth once again led the non-qualified cars (212.352 mph).

Friday May 21
Adrián Fernández topped the speed chart at 218.257 mph. Meanwhile, Buddy Lazier joined DRR to drive the #24 car (which later became #91 in a joint entry with Hemelgarn). On his first day of track activity, Lazier led non-qualified cars at 215.513 mph.

Saturday May 22
The final full day of practice saw heavy activity. P. J. Jones took to the track for the first time but only managed 208 mph. Buddy Lazier led the non-qualified car at over 214 mph.

Time trials - weekend 2

Bump Day - Sunday May 23
The final day of qualifying saw seven positions open in the field. P. J. Jones was the first car to qualify (213.355 mph), followed by Marty Roth and others. At 1:45 p.m., Greg Ray filled the field to 33 cars with a run of 216.641 mph; the fastest attempt of the afternoon.

A brief rain shower followed, with Robby McGehee sitting on the bubble as the slowest qualifier (211.631 mph). At that point, it did not appear that any additional drivers would make an attempt to qualify. The only driver left on the sidelines was Jaques Lazier, who briefly practiced during the week for Foyt. However, the ride fizzled. Nevertheless, the track was re-opened after the shower as track crews were able to dry the circuit.

During the afternoon, Tony Stewart visited the track. He was running full-time in NASCAR, and had raced in the NEXTEL All-Star Challenge the night prior. A. J. Foyt reportedly called Stewart while he was at the track and invited him to practice in one of his back-up cars. Stewart quickly passed his physical and went to the pit area to prepare for a possible qualifying attempt. With little else going on during the afternoon, the rumors quickly buzzed around the track and throngs of media surrounded Stewart to cover the breaking story.

With about an hour left in the day, a car was prepared for Stewart and fired up on pit lane. Stewart had yet to climb into the car but was suited up in his driving uniform. At 5:36 p.m., however, Stewart left the pits on foot and announced he would not make an attempt to qualify. Stewart's contracts with Joe Gibbs Racing, Home Depot, and Chevrolet precluded him from driving Foyt's Toyota Indy car.

Carb Day - Thursday May 26
The final practice was held Thursday May 26. Rahal Letterman Racing with driver Buddy Rice and chief mechanic Ricardo Nault won the Checkers/Rally's Pit Stop Challenge

Starting grid

Failed to qualify
#10  Luis Díaz (R) (participated in Rookie Orientation, but not official practice)
#14  Jaques Lazier (became relief driver for Robby Gordon)

Race recap

First rain delay
Rain fell early in the morning between 6:00-6:20 a.m. Rain resumed at 9:18 a.m. and continued intermittently until about 10:30 a.m. Track drying efforts began and the start of the race was delayed by a little over two hours. Mari Hulman George gave the traditional command to start engines at 1:02 p.m.

Start
At 1:07 p.m., the field pulled away for the pace laps, about two hours and fifteen minutes behind schedule. At the start, Buddy Rice took the lead from the pole position. Rice led Dario Franchitti, Tony Kanaan, Dan Wheldon, and Hélio Castroneves.

On lap 10, A. J. Foyt IV brushed the wall in turn four and spun and crashed in turn 1. Foyt was uninjured. Several of the leaders pitted under the caution. Bryan Herta led the field back to green on lap 16. Three laps later, Wheldon took the lead but on lap 22, rain began to fall again and the caution was out again. The field circulated under yellow for several laps and, on lap 28, the red flag came out. Rain was falling hard and the cars were parked in the pits. Many believed the resumption would have to be delayed until Monday.

Re-start
After a delay of 1 hour and 47 minutes, the race was ready to resume. Robby Gordon, who was attempting to race in both the Indy 500 and Coca-Cola 600, departed the grounds and flew to Charlotte. Jaques Lazier was standing by, and climbed in the car to drive relief.

Shortly after 3:30 p.m., the race continued. Dan Wheldon led at the green, but Buddy Rice quickly assumed the lead. An intense segment of racing saw several changes in position amongst the top 10 and the leaders racing closely together. On lap 56, Larry Foyt wrecked in turn two guaranteeing the Foyt team would finish 32nd-33rd.

First half
Buddy Rice continued to lead during the next stretch of green flag racing. Dan Wheldon and Sam Hornish Jr. ran 2nd-3rd.

The third crash of the day involved Ed Carpenter and Mark Taylor on lap 64.

As the race approached the halfway point, Rice still led and Wheldon and Hornish continued to battle for 2nd and 3rd. The top five were still within seconds of each other.

On lap 94, P. J. Jones made contact with the wall exiting turn 2. Jaques Lazier dropped out with a broken axle and leader Buddy Rice stalled exiting the pits. Dan Wheldon took over the lead with Hélio Castroneves now second and Rice dropping down to 8th.

Second half
As the race completed the 101st lap, it was scored official and would not need to carry over into a second day. On lap 105, Darren Manning and Greg Ray got together, crashing in turn four and collecting Sam Hornish Jr. The three cars slid into the end of the pit wall and came to rest at the entrance of the pits. Tony Kanaan now led with Rice still mired back in 8th.

Kanaan and Wheldon traded the lead a couple times until Marty Roth brought out the next caution by crashing in turn 4. Buddy Rice worked his way up to 5th for the restart. Meanwhile, Bruno Junqueira stayed out while the leaders pitted and took over the lead. Junquiera was gambling that his fuel would outlast the leaders in case rain were to resume.

Finish
At lap 150, Bruno Junqueira led Buddy Rice and Tony Kanaan. Approaching rain and one final round of pit stops for the leaders was looming and threatened to turn the result into a crap shoot. The first driver to go was Junqueira, who pitted for fuel and tires on lap 151.

The lead went back to Buddy Rice, who was followed closely by Tony Kanaan and Dan Wheldon. Kanaan ducked into the pits for fuel on lap 164 and Wheldon pitted on lap 165. Two laps later, Rice was in the pits, handing the lead over to Bryan Herta. Rain was fast approaching the Speedway and the race was not expected to reach the full distance before the rain fell. More of the leaders cycled into the pits.

Herta gave up the lead on lap 169 in order to pit for fuel. That handed the race lead to Adrian Fernandez as slight moisture was being reported around the track. Fernandez made it to lap 171 but significant rain was not falling yet and green flag conditions still prevailed. Fernandez made a quick 9-second pit stop but lost the lead. After the hectic sequence of pit stops, Buddy Rice was back into the lead.

With Rice leading, Kanaan second, and Wheldon back to third, rain started falling on lap 174. The yellow came out with Rice the certain winner. A severe thunderstorm approached the area and the race was halted after the completion of lap 180, 20 laps short of the finish. Lightning forced the victory celebration indoors to the Pagoda.

Rice became the first American winner since Eddie Cheever in 1998. It was also the first rain-shortened 500 since 1976. An F2 tornado missed the Speedway and its quarter-million spectators by six miles as it raked across the south central portion of Indianapolis. The tornado caused widespread damage.

On race day, May 30, precipitation in Indianapolis totaled 3.80 inches; a record single-day amount for that date, and any date during the month since records had been kept.

Results

 = Former Indianapolis 500 winner;  = Indianapolis 500 rookie

*C Chassis: D=Dallara, P=Panoz

*E Engine: C=Chevrolet, H=Honda, T=Toyota

All cars in the 2004 Indianapolis 500 used Firestone tires.

Notes: Race halted on lap 27 due to rain. The race was resumed and when rain pelted the Speedway again late in the race, officials waved the checkered flag 15 minutes after the traditional 6 PM closing time.  It was only the second time in IMS history racing went past the traditional 6 PM EST closing time;  in 1995, the Brickyard 400 raced into 7 PM EST (8 PM EDT) because of rain delays.  Since the state's adoption of Daylight Saving Time, there have been years where Indianapolis 500 qualifying has passed 6 PM, and the Brickyard 400 has reached past that time on occasion.  It is the only Indianapolis 500 to have reached 7 PM EDT.  Two races, the 1995 Brickyard 400 (8:07 PM EDT) and the 2017 Brantley Gilbert Big Machine Brickyard 400 (8:57 PM EDT), have reached the 8 PM EDT hour.

During the rain delay, Robby Gordon flew to Charlotte for the Coca-Cola 600, which prompted the team to put Jaques Lazier in the car, but a mechanical failure forced the car not to finish.

Broadcasting

Radio
The race was carried live on the Indianapolis Motor Speedway Radio Network. Mike King served as chief announcer. Kenny Bräck served as "driver expert" up until the rain delay. Bräck sat out the 2004 IndyCar season due to a major crash suffered at Texas in October 2003. This was the only time, other than 2011, that Bräck served as the driver expert on an American broadcast, however, he would serve in later years on international broadcasts.

Departing from the broadcast team were two longtime members, Howdy Bell and Chuck Marlowe. Donald Davidson celebrated his 40th year as a member of the crew, while Jerry Baker reached his milestone 30th race.

Kevin Lee moved from turn two to the pit area. Adam Alexander moved from the pits to the turn two location. This was Dave Argabright's first year on the network. This was the last year for both Jim Murphy and Kim Morris.

Television
The race was carried live flag-to-flag coverage in the United States on ABC Sports. The broadcast was billed as the Indianapolis 500 Presented by 7-Eleven. The broadcasting crew moved to a new booth, located in the Pit Road Suites next to the Pagoda. Several innovations were introduced, including the first 180-degree on-board rotating camera, and a Skycam along the mainstretch. The network celebrated its 40th anniversary covering the Indianapolis 500.

Bob Jenkins was released from ABC and ESPN after 2003, and his position as "host" was taken by Terry Gannon. Paul Page continued as play-by-play, along with Scott Goodyear. Jack Arute, who had been in the pit area from 1984-1998 and 2000-2003, moved into the booth as analyst for the 2004 race. Joining the crew for the first time were Todd Harris and Jamie Little, both as pit reporters.

Despite a lengthy rain delay throughout the afternoon, ABC stayed on-air all day with coverage, and filled the downtime with highlights and interviews. The marathon broadcast totaled 8 hours and 22 minutes.

The introduction, titled "The Chase," featuring Henry Rollins, would earn a Sports Emmy nomination for outstanding post produced audio/sound.

Gallery

Notes

References

Works cited
2004 Indianapolis 500 Daily Trackside Report for the Media
Indianapolis 500 History: Race & All-Time Stats - Official Site

Indianapolis 500 races
2004 in IndyCar
Indianapolis 500
Indianapolis 500
Indianapolis 500